Evelyne Datl is a Canadian musician, record producer, and composer of music for film and television.

Datl has played piano/keyboards in live performance and on recordings of many award-winning Canadian artists, notably Shirley Eikhard, Alannah Myles, Lorraine Segato and The Parachute Club.

Her film and television work can be heard on the TV shows Adventures of Dudley the Dragon, The Big Comfy Couch and What's for Dinner?, as well as in several feature films (Show Me), dramatic series (Crimes of Passion) and documentaries.

She has produced several artists as well as her own self-titled CD. She also appeared on the TV series Eric's World as a musician in the band from 1991 to 1995.

References

External links
Official site
MySpace page

Canadian women pianists
Canadian record producers
Canadian film score composers
Living people
Year of birth missing (living people)
21st-century Canadian pianists
Canadian women record producers
21st-century Canadian women musicians
Canadian women composers
21st-century women pianists